Ray Oldenburg (April 7, 1932 – November 21, 2022) was an American urban sociologist who is known for writing about the importance of informal public gathering places for a functioning civil society, democracy, and civic engagement. He coined the term "third place" and is the author of the books Celebrating The Third Place and The Great Good Place, which was a New York Times Book Review Editor's Choice for 1989.

He was born on April 7, 1932
and died on November 21, 2022, aged 90.

Academic career
Oldenburg was Professor Emeritus at the Department of Sociology and Anthropology at the University of West Florida in Pensacola. He received his B.S., Mankato State University, 1954; M.A., University of Minnesota, 1965; and Ph.D., University of Minnesota, 1968.

Philosophy
Oldenburg suggests that beer gardens, main streets, pubs, cafés, coffeehouses, post offices, and other "third places" are the heart of a community's social vitality and the foundation of a functioning democracy. They promote social equality by leveling the status of guests, provide a setting for grassroots politics, create habits of public association, and offer psychological support to individuals and communities.

Oldenburg identifies that in modern suburban societies time is primarily spent in isolated first (home) and second (work) places. In contrast, third places offer a neutral public space for a community to connect and establish bonds. Third places "host the regular, voluntary, informal, and happily anticipated gatherings of individuals beyond the realms of home and work."

Bibliography

Oldenburg, Ray (2018). The Joy of Tippling: A Salute to Bars, Taverns, and Pubs. Great Barrington, Massachusetts: Berkshire Publishing Group. ISBN  978-1614728382.

References

1932 births
2022 deaths
University of Minnesota alumni
American sociologists
Urban sociologists